Juvenal de Araújo (21 November 1892 - 2 November 1976) was a Madeiran politician.

References 

1892 births
1976 deaths
Madeiran politicians